= Oakland Municipal Garage and Repair Shop =

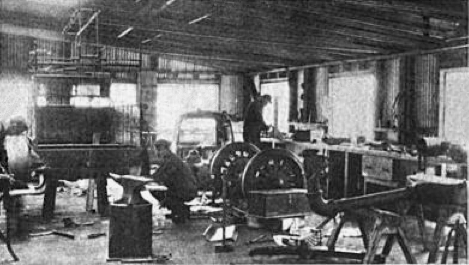
Interior of the Oakland Municipal Garage and Repair Shop. A combination hose and chemical truck is under construction.

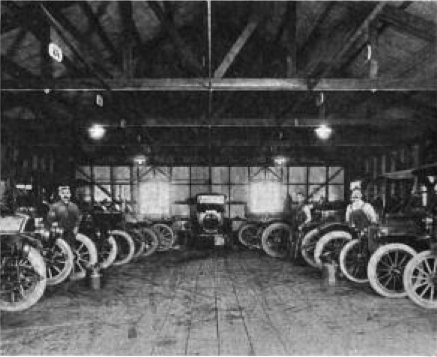
Oakland Municipal Garage and Repair Shop

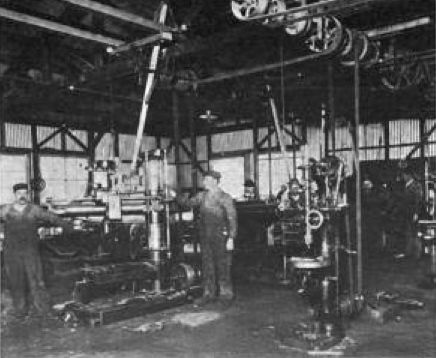
Oakland Municipal Garage and Repair Shop

Oakland Municipal Garage and Repair Shop was located in Oakland, California, US, a short distance from the city hall. The plant was under the supervision of the Street Department of the City of Oakland. It was established by the city in 1913 for the maintenance and repair of all municipal automobiles. It was said to be the most economically operated in the United States when comparison was made with corresponding costs of cars operated by large public service corporations, mercantile establishments, and garages operated by other municipalities.

== History ==
In 1913, the city of Oakland found that its automobile service called for attention, lest the operating cost should run beyond all fair proportions. To this end, with the cooperation of the Commissioner of Streets, the municipal garage was established in March, 1913, where every city department car could be brought under systematic control and supervision. The only exceptions were the police and the fire department machines, which were required to be handled within those departments.

For the first year of operation, ended July 1, 1914, the average cost per mile was $0.075, showing a reduction of $0.011 per mile for the first half of the second year's work. This comparison was in line with data collected before the municipal garage was opened. City machines were then under individual department control. For the six months ended December 31, 1914, the cost per mile for each city machine was $0.064, as compared with $0.082 and $0.094 by the two largest private users of automobiles. Further comparisons showed that city cars had operated at an average cost of $40 per month against $60 to $65 a month in private business, where the number of cars in service was in fair ratio to those of the municipality.

== Operations ==
Machine shops and all accessories for the entire care of the city machines was installed. The service rendered included not only washing, oiling, gasoline and tire supply and ordinary repairing, but the overhauling or reconstruction of machines, after they had been run 10,000 miles or more. Repainting, bodybuilding and reupholstering were also done by the city garage force.

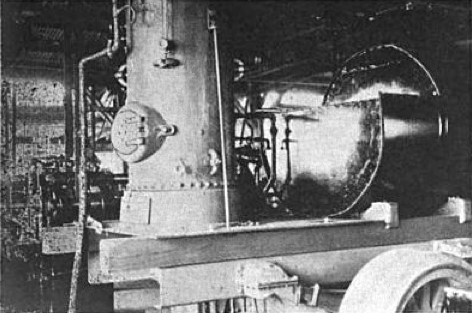
Close-up view of the rear end equipment of a large oil-spreader constructed by the employees at the Oakland municipal machine shops.

The municipal garage and repair shops included a complete machine-shop, blacksmith-shop, paint-shop, and two garages which provided storage for cars belonging to the following city departments: Street, Health, Park, Playground, Harbor, Engineering, Auditors, Electrical, Building, and Public affairs. The garage and repair shops maintained and repaired all these cars as well as the motorized fire apparatus, chief and battalion chiefs' cars, two patrol wagons and all the cars operated by the Police Department.

A number of different pieces of apparatus were constructed in the municipal shop, these including fire apparatus, oil spreaders, and trucks. The department constructed a number of oil spreaders for spreading hot oil for use in new streets and also in repair work. The shops constructed a combination hose and chemical truck which was used in connection with the high pressure fire protection system. Steam engine fire trucks were motorized by installing front drive tractors, as well as several ladder trucks. At a cost of about $800 each, a number of Fords were equipped with Ralston truck attachment and specially designed four-yard dump bodies, which were employed in picking up the contents of the street sweepers' cans and hauling them to the dump. The machine shop has built a number of trucks for the sewer repair crews, using second hand Cadillac chassis and installing a small wagon bed in the rear of the seat, capable of carrying about 1,500 lbs. of material such as sewer pipe, cement, brick, shovels and other tools. Two patrol wagons were built, using Cadillac chassis, the bodies being made at the municipal shop and all necessary changes to the chassis, the cost being approximately $1,800 each. These wagons were used for police duty and ambulance calls.

A stock room was operated in connection with the machine shop. It carried parts for all of the makes of cars in the various city departments. Gasoline for operating the automotive vehicles was bought in the open market and stored in two underground tanks with a combined capacity of 560 gallons. Lubricating oil was stored in tanks, two in each garage.

There were three hostlers at the municipal shops whose duties consist of seeing that the automobiles were properly supplied with gasoline and oil, and were washed when necessary, the intervals between washings averaging about three months. In case a car was wanted at the city hall in a hurry by a department head, it was delivered by one of the hostlers.
